Northern Territories may refer to several geographic locations:
, a term used by Japan to refer to the parts of Kuril Islands claimed by Japan and occupied by Russia. See Kuril Islands dispute
Historical name of part of Ghana, a former British Empire protectorate, itself divided into the Northern, Upper East and Upper West Regions of modern Ghana
Historical name for the regions of Northern Rhodesia and Nyasaland within the Federation of Rhodesia and Nyasaland

It may informally refer to:
Northern Territories of Canada, the Yukon Territory, Northwest Territories, and Nunavut
Northern territories of Israel, the Northern District and occupied Golan Heights

See also
Northwest Territories, Canada
Northern Territory, an Australian territory
Northern (disambiguation) to see other types